The women's 500 metres at the 2007 Asian Winter Games was held on 30 January 2007 in Changchun, China.

Schedule
All times are China Standard Time (UTC+08:00)

Records

500 meters

500 meters × 2

Results
Legend
DNF — Did not finish
DNS — Did not start

References
Results
Results

External links
Official website

Women 500
Asia